Hell Frost is the debut album by The Unguided. The album was released on 30 November 2011 through Despotz Records and was produced by Jonas Kjellgren. The album has been described by singer Richard Sjunnesson as a lyrical sequel to Eden Fire by Sonic Syndicate, their former band.

Writing and recording
Prior to the release of Hell Frost the band released an EP including the two tracks "Green Eyed Demon" and "Pathfinder", which were re-recorded for the album.

On 28 April  2011 the band announced that pre-production of their debut album had officially begun. They also revealed that Jonas Kjellgren also would be producing the album and that The Unguided had signed a deal with Despotz Records to release and distribute it. In June 2011 The Unguided officially began recording their debut album.

On 3 October Despotz Records announced that the recording, mixing and mastering of Hell Frost was completed. On 25 October it was announced that 12 tracks were made for the album, but only 11 tracks made it to the album due to The Unguided wanting to get the album faster out instead of delaying it further, seeing how it was supposed to be released in the summer of 2011. On 30 November Hell Frost was released.

Besides Peter Tägtgren, there are no guest singers on the album. The Unguided confirmed that Mikael Stanne (Dark Tranquillity), Whiplasher Bernadotte (Deathstars), Hansi Kürsch (Blind Guardian), and Christoffer Andersson (Dead by April) agreed to record guest vocals, but not for Hell Frost due to its release date. Richard, however, hopes to include them when they record their next album.

Release and promotion
On 16 June 2011, without any official announcement, The Unguided released their debut single "Betrayer of the Code". "Betrayer of the Code" was originally written by Roger and Richard when they still played in Fallen Angels. The artwork for the single was made by Jose A. Aranguren, the same person who made the artwork for the Sonic Syndicate album Eden Fire and the alternative version of Nightmareland.

On 3 October the artwork and title of their debut album Hell Frost was revealed at 616. The artwork was done by Kuang Hong, the same person who made the artwork for Nightmareland. The layout and booklet design was made by Gustavo Sazes.

On 8 October it was revealed to be "Tankens Mirakel" by the Swedish EBM duo Spark. The song has been translated into English and will appear on the album with the title "The Miracle of Mind". It will be the JakeBox exclusive bonus track for Hell Frost.  On 11 October the Swedish radio station Bandit Rock premiered the song "Inherit the Earth", a preview of the song had been played the day before as well.

On 25 October it was announced that "Inherit the Earth" would be the lead single off the album. "Phoenix Down" was originally intended as the lead single. The artwork for the single was made by Jose A. Aranguren.

On 18 November Richard posted the following on his blog: "The song we decided to visualize was “Phoenix Down”. It’s a dynamic and fairly accessible song, which we felt would represent the band in a good way as an introduction video. Also it has been one of the fan favorites in our live set as far as we could tell".

Style and composition
According to singer Richard Sjunnesson, the music played by The Unguided is similar in genre to their old band Sonic Syndicate before they started playing a more mainstream rock style on their fourth album We Rule the Night. Some songs were originally written for that album, such as Phoenix Down. Richard has described Hell Frost as a sequel to Sonic Syndicate's debut album Eden Fire, which is considered by many to be the bands heaviest record.

Track listing
All tracks composed by Roger Sjunnesson & Roland Johansson. 
All lyrics written by Richard Sjunnesson.

Background
 "Inherith the Earth" was originally written by Fallen Angels on their debut EP Fall from Heaven. The original song was composed by Roger Sjunnesson and written by Richard Sjunnesson.
 "Phoenix Down" was originally written by Sonic Syndicate for their EP Burn This City, but was never used. The original song was composed by Roger Sjunnesson and written by Richard Sjunnesson.
 "Betrayer of the Code" was originally written by Fallen Angels on their debut EP Fall from Heaven. The original song was composed by Roger Sjunnesson and written by Richard Sjunnesson. The re-recording of the song was first released as a single version, which featured alternate keyboards.
 "Green Eyed Demon" was originally released on The Unguided debut EP Nightmareland. The EP version featured alternate drums and keyboards.
 "Iceheart Fragment" was originally written by Sonic Syndicate for their EP Burn This City, but was never used. The song original song was called "Assassination of a Martyr" and was composed by Roger Sjunnesson and written by Richard Sjunnesson.
 "Pathfinder" was originally released on The Unguided debut EP Nightmareland. The EP version featured alternate drums and keyboards.
 "The Miracle of Mind" was originally written by Spark!

Personnel 
The Unguided
 Richard Sjunnesson - harsh vocals
 Roland Johansson - clean vocals, lead guitar
 Roger Sjunnesson - rhythm guitar, keyboards

Session musicians
 Jonas Kjellgren (Scar Symmetry) - bass
 Pontus Hjelm (Dead by April) - additional keyboards
 Peter Tägtgren (Pain, Hypocrisy) - additional harsh vocals on "Pathfinder"
 John Bengtsson - drums 

Other
 Henric Carlsson - bass 

Production
 Produced, mixed and engineered by Jonas Kjellgren
 Artwork by Kuang Hong
 Artwork layout design by Gustavo Sazes
 Additional artwork by Jose A. Aranguren

References

2011 debut albums
The Unguided albums